Projax stands for Prototype and Ajax. This is a port of RoR prototype and script.aculo.us helpers to standalone PHP classes. This port allows you to use most Ajax functions of Prototype and simplifies user interface design using script.aculo.us. It has a small footprint and is PHP4 and PHP5 compatible.

External links
 Projax Demos

Ajax (programming)